Horniulus is a genus of beetles in the family Carabidae, containing the following species:

 Horniulus andrewesi Jedlicka, 1932
 Horniulus quadrimaculata Lowerens, 1953

References

Lebiinae